Samuel Lombard Brown (1858 – 14 December 1939) was an Irish politician and barrister. He was an independent member of Seanad Éireann from 1923 to 1925 and from 1926 to 1936. He was elected at a by-election on 12 December 1923, replacing Sir Horace Plunkett, but lost his seat at the 1925 Seanad election. He was re-elected at a by-election on 10 February 1926, replacing Windham Wyndham-Quin. He was re-elected at the 1934 Seanad election and served until the Free State Seanad was abolished in 1936.

References

1858 births
1939 deaths
Independent members of Seanad Éireann
Irish barristers
Members of the 1922 Seanad
Members of the 1925 Seanad
Members of the 1928 Seanad
Members of the 1931 Seanad
Members of the 1934 Seanad